Nenad Lončar (born March 6, 1981 in Belgrade) is a former Serbian hurdler. He competed at the 2004 Summer Olympics in Athens, Greece.

Competition record

References

External links
 
 All-athletics.com profile
 Sports-Reference.com

1981 births
Living people
Serbian male hurdlers
Athletes from Belgrade
Olympic athletes of Serbia and Montenegro
Athletes (track and field) at the 2004 Summer Olympics
Mediterranean Games bronze medalists for Yugoslavia
Athletes (track and field) at the 2001 Mediterranean Games
Mediterranean Games medalists in athletics